William Henry Brown may refer to:

 William Henry Brown (playwright) (1790–1884), American playwright and founder of the African theatre
 William Henry Brown (journalist) (1867 or 1868–1950), British co-operative movement journalist and activist
 William Henry Brown (botanist) (1884–1939), author and director of the Bureau of Science in Manila, Philippines
 William Henry Brown (aviator) (1894–1969), Canadian World War I flying ace
 Bill Brown (New Zealand politician) (1899–1967), New Zealand politician of the National Party

See also 
 William Brown (disambiguation)
 List of people with surname Brown